The 1999 National Hockey League All-Star Game took place on January 24, 1999, at Ice Palace in Tampa, home to the Tampa Bay Lightning.

"North America" and the World
The major criticism of the North America versus World format was that Canadians still represented the majority of the NHL players, and it clearly showed in the team selection: the 49th game only saw five Americans as part of the North America roster, and many notable greats were left off the all-star ballot simply as there were too many names to choose from. Some pundits even claimed that a second competitive North American all-star team could have been made from players that were not invited.

The format also allowed for teammates to face each other, something that had not been done since the 6th National Hockey League All-Star Game. Where the Colorado Avalanche, Dallas Stars, Detroit Red Wings, Montreal Canadiens, and Vancouver Canucks were among the teams that sent players to both all-star teams the year before, the fact that teammates now opposed each other was more evident in this game.

Among the more pronounced comments came from last year's winning coach Ken Hitchcock, who came off his first ever all-star game victory at any level of hockey (he had been 0–11 prior to this game): he wished that perhaps the game could be held in Europe so that the World team would have a "home game".

Super Skills Competition
The World All-Stars won their second-straight skills competition over the North American All-Stars.  Boston Bruins' Ray Bourque for the second straight season would have to share his Accuracy Shooting event victory with Phoenix Coyotes' Keith Tkachuk and Jeremy Roenick. In the Hardest Shot event, St. Louis Blues' defencemen Al MacInnis would win the event for the third-straight season and fifth all-time.

Individual Event winners
 Puck Control Relay – Paul Kariya (Mighty Ducks of Anaheim)
 Fastest Skater – Peter Bondra (Washington Capitals) – 14.640 seconds
 Accuracy Shooting – Ray Bourque (Boston Bruins)/Keith Tkachuk (Phoenix Coyotes)/Jeremy Roenick (Phoenix Coyotes) – 4 hits, 6 shots
 Hardest Shot – Al MacInnis (St. Louis Blues) – 98.5 mph
 Goaltenders Competition - Arturs Irbe (Carolina Hurricanes) - 2 GA, 16 shots

The game
The North American All-Stars defeated the World All-Stars for the second-straight year by a score of 8–6. Dallas Stars' Mike Modano and Toronto Maple Leafs' Mats Sundin recorded four points, while Carolina Hurricanes' goaltender Arturs Irbe recorded an assist to become the first goaltender in history to be credited with a point in the All-Star Game.  However, New York Rangers' center Wayne Gretzky would steal the spotlight in his last All-Star appearance by recording three points to win his third-career All-Star M.V.P. honor.

Summary

Referee: Paul Devorski
Linesmen: Pierre Champoux, Brian Murphy
Television: Fox, CBC, SRC

Rosters

Notes

Steve Yzerman was voted as a starter, but was not able to play due to injury.  Eric Lindros was selected to replace Yzerman in the starting lineup, but passed the honor to Wayne Gretzky.
Uwe Krupp was voted as a starter, but was not able to play due to injury.  Teppo Numminen was named as his replacement in the starting lineup.
Curtis Joseph was selected, but did not play.  Ron Tugnutt was his replacement.
 Kenny Jonsson and Viktor Kozlov were named to the World team, but did not play.

See also
1998–99 NHL season

All-Star Game
National Hockey League All-Star Game
20th century in Tampa, Florida
National Hockey League All-Star Games
Ice hockey competitions in Tampa, Florida
National Hockey League All-Star Game